Onithochiton is a genus of chitons in the subfamily Toniciinae of the family Chitonidae, which is distributed from Australia and New Zealand to South Africa.

Species
 Onithochiton ashbyi Bednall & Matthews, 1906
 Onithochiton discrepans Hedley & Hull, 1912
 Onithochiton erythraeus Thiele, 1909
 Onithochiton gotoi Van Belle, 1993
 Onithochiton helenae (Mackay, 1933)
 Onithochiton hirasei Pilsbry, 1901
 Onithochiton literatus (Krauss, 1848)
 Onithochiton lyellii (G.B. Sowerby I in Broderip & Sowerby, 1832)
 Onithochiton maillardi (Deshayes, 1863)
 Onithochiton maklayi Sirenko, 2019
 Onithochiton margueritae Kaas, Van Belle & Strack, 2006
 Onithochiton neglectus neglectus Rochebrune, 1881
 Onithochiton neglectus opiniosus Iredale and Hull, 1932
 Onithochiton neglectus subantarcticus Suter, 1907
 Onithochiton noemiae (Rochebrune, 1884)
 Onithochiton oliveri Iredale, 1914
 Onithochiton quercinus (Gould, 1846)
 Onithochiton rugulosus Angas, 1867
 Onithochiton semisculptus Pilsbry, 1893 (synonym of Onithochiton neglectus neglectus Rochebrune, 1881)
 Onithochiton societatis Thiele, 1909
 Onithochiton stracki Sirenko, 2012
 Onithochiton vandingeneni Dell'Angelo, Landau, Sosso & Taviani, 2020

Species brought into synonymy
 Onithochiton astrolabei Rochebrune, 1881: synonym of Onithochiton neglectus Rochebrune, 1881
 Onithochiton caliginosus Pilsbry, 1893: synonym of Liolophura japonica (Lischke, 1873)
 Onithochiton decipiens Rochebrune, 1882: synonym of Onithochiton neglectus Rochebrune, 1881
 Onithochiton filholi Rochebrune, 1881: synonym of Onithochiton neglectus Rochebrune, 1881
 Onithochiton isipingoensis Sykes, 1901: synonym of Craspedochiton isipingoensis (Sykes, 1901) (original combination)
 Onithochiton lyelli G.B. Sowerby I, 1832: synonym of Onithochiton maillardi (Deshayes, 1863) (misinterpretation according to Kaas et al. 2006)
 Onithochiton margaritiferum Rochebrune, 1883: synonym of Calloplax janeirensis (Gray, 1828): synonym of Rhyssoplax janeirensis (Gray, 1828)
 Onithochiton marmoratus Wissel, 1904: synonym of Onithochiton neglectus Rochebrune, 1881
 Onithochiton nodosus Suter, 1907: synonym of Onithochiton neglectus Rochebrune, 1881
 Onithochiton opiniosus Iredale & Hull, 1932: synonym of Onithochiton neglectus neglectus Rochebrune, 1881
 Onithochiton pruinosum Rochebrune, 1884: synonym of Stenoplax purpurascens (C. B. Adams, 1845)
 Onithochiton rugulosus Angas, 1867: synonym of Onithochiton quercinus (Gould, 1846)
 Onithochiton scholvieni Thiele, 1909: synonym of Onithochiton quercinus (Gould, 1846)
 Onithochiton semisculptus Pilsbry, 1893: synonym of Onithochiton neglectus Rochebrune, 1881
 Onithochiton undulatus (G. B. Sowerby I, 1839): synonym of Onithochiton neglectus Rochebrune, 1881
 Onithochiton wahlbergi (Krauss, 1848): synonym of Onithochiton literatus (F. Krauss, 1848)

References

 Kaas P., Van Belle R.A. & Strack H. 2006. Monograph of living chitons (Mollusca: Polyplacaphora); volume 6: Suborder Ischnochitonina (concluded); Schizochitonidae & Chitonidae, additions to volumes 1-5. Brill, Leiden, 464 pp
  O'Neill, M. H. B. (1985). A review of the living New Zealand members of Onithochiton Gray, 1847 (Mollusca: Polyplacophora). New Zealand Journal of Zoology 12: 141-154.
 Discover Life
 Powell A. W. B., New Zealand Mollusca, William Collins Publishers Ltd, Auckland, New Zealand 1979

External links
 Gray, J. E. (1847). On the genera of the family Chitonidae. Proceedings of the Zoological Society of London. (1847) 15: 63-70

Chitonidae
Taxa named by John Edward Gray